The Unknown is a 1913 silent film drama short directed, written by and starring Romaine Fielding with costars Mary Ryan and Robyn Adair. It was produced by the Lubin Manufacturing Company and released by General Film Company.

Cast
Romaine Fielding - Julio
Mary Ryan - Juanita
Robyn Adair - Robert Tyler
Richard Wangermann - Juanita's Father

References

External links
The Unknown at IMDb.com

1913 films
American silent short films
1913 short films
American black-and-white films
Lubin Manufacturing Company films
Films directed by Romaine Fielding
Silent American drama films
1913 drama films
1910s American films
1910s English-language films